Krummholz  ("crooked, bent, twisted" and Holz, "wood") — also called knieholz ("knee timber") — is a type of stunted, deformed vegetation encountered in the subarctic and subalpine tree line landscapes, shaped by continual exposure to fierce, freezing winds. Under these conditions, trees can only survive where they are sheltered by rock formations or snow cover. As the lower portion of these trees continues to grow, the coverage becomes extremely dense near the ground. In Newfoundland and Labrador, the formation is known as tuckamore. Krummholz trees are also found on beaches such as the Oregon coast, where trees can become much taller than their subalpine cousins.

Species

Common trees showing krummholz formation include European spruce, mountain pine, balsam fir, red spruce, black spruce, subalpine fir, subalpine larch, Engelmann spruce, whitebark pine, limber pine, Bristlecone pine, and lodgepole pine. Instances of the krummholz form of black spruce, Picea mariana, are found in the northern Canadian boreal forests. Krummholz-form black spruce and balsam fir are abundant in the alpine transition zone of the White Mountains of Maine and New Hampshire and of the same zone in the Green Mountains of Vermont.

Subalpine fir is the most common associate of spruce in krummholz vegetation. Other associated coniferous species include alpine larch (Larix lyallii), whitebark pine (Pinus albicaulis), limber pine (Pinus flexilis), and western white pine (Pinus monticola) in southern British Columbia, and mountain hemlock (Tsuga mertensiana) on the eastern slopes of the Coast Range and in the Revelstoke area of British Columbia. Lodgepole pine (Pinus contorta var. contorta) is a minor associate in most of the British Columbia interior, except in dry alpine areas of the southwest Cariboo/Chilcotin district where it is abundant (Pojar 1985). Ericaceous species (Vaccinium scoparium, V. membranaceum, V. caespitosum, Cassiope mertensiana, Phyllodoce empetriformis) are common in the snow accumulation zone around the base of krummholz colonies.

Flag tree

A variation of krummholz formation is a flag tree or banner tree. Branches on the windward side are killed or deformed by the almost constant strong winds, giving the tree a characteristic flag-like appearance. Where the lower portion of the tree is protected by snow cover or rocks, only the exposed upper portion may have this appearance. This is a rather common occurrence in red spruce trees of the highest peaks of the central and even the southern Appalachian Mountains, and is most often seen in the windswept high peaks and plateaus of the Allegheny Mountains. Trade winds in tropical regions near the equator can also shape trees in a similar manner. The southernmost reaches of the Magellanic subpolar forests of Chile contain many flag trees also.

See also

 Dwarf forest
 Libidibia coriaria (divi-divi)
 Pinus mugo (scrub mountain pine)
 Reaction wood
 Windthrow

References

Further reading 

 Recent history of subalpine Krummholz
 Maintaining Krummholz above treeline

External links

Krumholtz formation in Hudson Bay subarctic landscape

Trees
Conifers
Forest ecology
Montane ecology